Richard Ward may refer to:

People
Richard Ward (footballer) (born 1973), former English footballer
Richard Ward (British Army officer) (1917–1989)
Richard Ward (actor) (1915–1979), African American actor
Richard Ward (businessman) (born 1957), British businessman
Richard Ward (governor) (1689–1763), governor of the Colony of Rhode Island and Providence Plantations
Richard Ward (priest), Archdeacon of Cardigan, 1951–1962
Richard Ward (judge) (1916–1977), Australian jurist and politician
Richard S. Ward (born 1951), professor of mathematics at Durham University
Richard F. Ward (born 1951), American storyteller and professor
Richard Ward (c.1990-2022), unarmed man killed by police at Liberty Point International Middle School
Rich Ward (born 1969), guitarist
Dick Ward (1909–1966), baseball player
Rick Ward III (born 1982), Louisiana politician
Sir Richard Warde or Ward (died 1578), English politician and royal official

Other uses
USS J. Richard Ward (DE-243), named for James R. Ward

See also 
 James R. Ward (James Richard Ward, 1921–1941), US Navy sailor who died on board the battleship USS Oklahoma (BB-37) during the attack on Pearl Harbor
 Richard Ward Pelham (1815–1876), American blackface performer